Eurosia is a genus of moths in the family Erebidae. The genus was erected by George Hampson in 1900.

Species
 Eurosia annulata
 Eurosia bicolor
 Eurosia costinota
 Eurosia fuliginea
 Eurosia fuscipunctata
 Eurosia grisea
 Eurosia lineata
 Eurosia ludekingi
 Eurosia melanopera
 Eurosia puncticosta
 Eurosia punctitermia
 Eurosia substrigillata
 Eurosia trimaculata

References

External links

Nudariina
Moth genera